Albonectria is a genus of ascomycete fungi in the family Nectriaceae.

Further reading
Rossman, A.Y.; Samuels, G.J.; Rogerson, C.T.; Lowen, R. 1999. Genera of Bionectriaceae, Hypocreaceae and Nectriaceae (Hypocreales, Ascomycetes). Studies in Mycology. 42:1-248

References

Nectriaceae genera